Greenwich Point ferry wharf is located on Sydney Harbour serving the Sydney suburb of Greenwich. The single wharf is served by First Fleet and Emerald class ferries. It is also served by limited school term services by Captain Cook Cruises services to Hunters Hill.

Greenwich is served by a second wharf at the end of Bay Street called Greenwich Wharf, located on the Lane Cove River and served by more Captain Cook Cruises services to Hunters Hill.

Wharves & services

Transport links
Greenwich Point wharf is served by Busways route 265 to Lane Cove and North Sydney.

References

External links

 Greenwich Point Wharf at Transport for New South Wales (Archived 12 June 2019)
Greenwich Point Local Area Map Transport for NSW
 Greenwich Wharf at Transport for New South Wales

Ferry transport in Sydney
Ferry wharves in Sydney